Now That's What I Call Music! 20 is the 20th edition of the (U.S.) Now! series. It was released on November 1, 2005. It debuted at number-one on the Billboard 200 and is the eighth number-one album in the series. The albums has been certified 2× Platinum.

Track listing

Reception

Andy Kellman in his review for AllMusic recognizes that a lot of top artists contribute to Now! 20 but those artists "deliver songs that are either tepid retreads or safe compounds of past hits", but it's the songs by the newer artists of the time "that keeps the compilation from being disposable", pointing out tracks by the Pussycat Dolls, Fall Out Boy, and Rihanna as standouts from this volume.

Charts

Weekly charts

Year-end charts

References

2005 compilation albums
 020
Universal Music Group compilation albums